Dev Singh Dhillon (born 24 April 1977) is an Indian record producer, musician and singer-songwriter. His 2012 album, Mulakaat, was produced by Aman Hayer. There were 2 Singles which is the forthcoming album Mulakaat: "Hor Nachna" & "Ankhi".

Discography

References

External links
 Discography on Sada Punjab

Bhangra (music)
English Sikhs
People from Birmingham, West Midlands
Living people
Indian emigrants to England
Punjabi people
1972 births
English people of Punjabi descent
People from Ludhiana